Deh Choqai (also Romanized as Deh Choqā’ī and Deh Cheqā’ī; also known as Choqā’ī, Deh Chagha’ī and Deh Cheqāsī) is a village in Gamasiyab Rural District, in the Central District of Nahavand County, Hamadan Province, Iran. At the 2006 census, its population was 541, in 142 families.

References 

Populated places in Nahavand County